The 1907 Wellington City mayoral election was part of the New Zealand local elections held that same year. In 1907, elections were held for the Mayor of Wellington plus other local government positions  including fifteen city councillors. The polling was conducted using the standard first-past-the-post electoral method.

Background
Thomas William Hislop, the incumbent Mayor, was re-elected to office as Mayor of Wellington, beating Thomas Wilford.

Mayoralty results

Councillor results

References

Mayoral elections in Wellington
1907 elections in New Zealand
Politics of the Wellington Region
1900s in Wellington